Pseudomugil is a genus of fish in the subfamily Pseudomugilinae endemic to Australia and New Guinea, where they are found in freshwater rivers and streams and bodies of brackish water.

Description
Members of this genus have slender bodies and two dorsal fins. They are usually sexually dimorphic. The name of this genus is a combination of pseudo meaning "false" and mugil meaning "mullet", referring to the resemblance of the body shape of this genus to that of the unrelated mullets.

Species
There are currently 16 recognized species in this genus:
 Pseudomugil connieae (G. R. Allen, 1981) (Popondetta blue-eye)
 Pseudomugil cyanodorsalis G. R. Allen & Sarti, 1983 (Neon blue-eye)
 Pseudomugil furcatus Nichols, 1955 (Fork-tail blue-eye)
 Pseudomugil gertrudae M. C. W. Weber, 1911 (Spotted blue-eye) 
 Pseudomugil inconspicuus T. R. Roberts, 1978 (Inconspicuous blue-eye)
 Pseudomugil ivantsoffi G. R. Allen & Renyaan, 1999 (Ivantsoff's blue-eye)
 Pseudomugil luminatus G. R. Allen, Unmack & Hadiaty, 2016 (Red Neon blue-eye) 
 Pseudomugil majusculus Ivantsoff & G. R. Allen, 1984 (Cape blue-eye)
 Pseudomugil mellis G. R. Allen & Ivantsoff, 1982 (Honey blue-eye)
 Pseudomugil novaeguineae M. C. W. Weber, 1907 (New Guinea blue-eye)
 Pseudomugil paludicola G. R. Allen & R. Moore, 1981 (Swamp blue-eye)
 Pseudomugil paskai G. R. Allen & Ivantsoff, 1986 (Paska's blue-eye)
 Pseudomugil pellucidus G. R. Allen & Ivantsoff, 1998 (Transparent blue-eye)
 Pseudomugil reticulatus G. R. Allen & Ivantsoff, 1986 (Vogelkop blue-eye)
 Pseudomugil signifer Kner, 1866 (Pacific blue-eye)
 Pseudomugil tenellus W. R. Taylor, 1964 (Delicate blue-eye)

References

External links
 Pacific blue-eye in the wild video on Youtube
 Wild Pacific blue-eye video on Youtube

 
Freshwater fish genera
Pseudomugilinae
Taxa named by Rudolf Kner
Taxonomy articles created by Polbot